Through an Open Window is a 1993 American short film directed by Eric Mendelsohn and starring F. Murray Abraham. It was screened in the Un Certain Regard section at the 1992 Cannes Film Festival.

Cast
 F. Murray Abraham
 Frances Foster as Dianne
 Anne Meara
 Cynthia Nixon

References

External links

1993 films
1993 short films
American black-and-white films
American short films
Films directed by Eric Mendelsohn
1990s English-language films